Emmanuel Bonne (born 13 August 1970) is a French career diplomat who has served as diplomatic advisor to the President of France since 2019. During his tenure under Emmanuel Macron he has been playing a role in various matters such as the 45th G7 summit, the Joint Comprehensive Plan of Action, negotiations following the incarceration of Fariba Adelkhah and Roland Marchal in Iran, Nord Stream 2 and the AUKUS pact, as well as in bilateral relations with various countries. A former ambassador, Bonne is a former political scientist specializing in issues of the Middle East.

Diplomatic career
Bonne is a graduate of the Grenoble Institute of Political Studies with a Diplôme d'études approfondies in Comparative politics. After working as a researcher at the CERMOC in Beirut he was admitted to the competitive examination as a Conseiller des affaires étrangères du cadre d'Orient in March 2000. Thereafter he has held several positions and diplomatic ranks:
 2000-2003:  at the Central Administration (North Africa and Middle East)
 2003-2006:  in Tehran
 2006-2009:  in Riyadh
 2009-2012:  at the Permanent Mission of France to the United Nations
 2012-2015: Advisor for North Africa and the Middle East in the diplomatic cell
 2015-2017: Ambassador to Lebanon
 2017-2019:  of the newly reorganized Ministry for Europe and Foreign Affairs

Publications

Awards
Honour medal of Foreign Affairs (2004)
Officer of the National Order of the Cedar (2017)

Notes

References

Further reading
 John Bolton's account of interactions with Bonne during the Presidency of Donald Trump.
 A news report on Macron's foreign policy.

1970 births
21st-century French civil servants
21st-century French diplomats
Ambassadors of France to Lebanon
Grenoble Alpes University alumni
Living people
Officers of the National Order of the Cedar
Presidential advisors